The Unification of Saudi Arabia was a military and political campaign in which the various tribes, sheikhdoms, city-states, emirates, and kingdoms of most of the central Arabian Peninsula were conquered by the House of Saud, or Al Saud. Unification started in 1902 and continued until 1932, when the Kingdom of Saudi Arabia was proclaimed under the leadership of Abdulaziz, known in the West as Ibn Saud, creating what is sometimes referred to as the Third Saudi State, to differentiate it from the Emirate of Diriyah, the First Saudi State and the Emirate of Nejd, the Second Saudi State, also House of Saud states.

The Al-Saud had been in exile in the British-protected Emirate of Kuwait since 1893, after their second episode of removal from power and dissolution of their polity, this time by the Al Rashid Emirate of Ha'il. In 1902, Abdulaziz Al Saud recaptured Riyadh, the Al Saud dynasty's former capital. He went on to subdue the rest of Nejd, al-Hasa, Jebel Shammar, Asir, and Hejaz (the location of the Muslim holy cities of Mecca and Medina) between 1913 and 1926. The resultant polity was named the Kingdom of Nejd and Hejaz from 1927 until it was further consolidated with al-Hasa into the Kingdom of Saudi Arabia in 1932.

It has often been claimed that this process caused some 400,000 to 800,000 casualties. However, recent research suggests that though bloody, the number of deaths and injuries was significantly lower.

Background

Following the Diriyah agreement between Muhammad ibn Abdul Wahhab and Muhammad ibn Saud, the Al Saud clan founded the First Saudi State, a state based on a strict interpretation of Islam. The ideology born of this period was later dubbed Wahhabism. Originating in the Nejd region of central Arabia, the First Saudi State conquered most of the Arabian Peninsula, culminating in the capture of the Muslim holy city of Mecca in 1802.

The loss of Mecca was a significant blow to the prestige of the Ottoman Empire, which had exercised sovereignty over the holy city since 1517, and the Ottomans were finally moved to action against the Al Saud. The task of destroying the Saudis was given to the powerful viceroy of Egypt, Muhammad Ali Pasha, who sent troops to the Hejaz region and recaptured Mecca. His son, Ibrahim Pasha, meanwhile led Ottoman forces into the heart of Nejd, capturing town after town in the Nejd Expedition. On reaching the Saudi capital at Diriyah, Ibrahim placed it under siege for several months until it surrendered in the winter of 1818. He then sent many members of the clans of Al Saud and Ibn Abdul Wahhab to Egypt and the Ottoman capital of Constantinople and ordered the systematic destruction of Diriyah. The last Saudi imam (leader), Abdullah bin Saud, was later executed in Istanbul.

The Al Saud survived in exile and went on to found the Second Saudi State, which is generally considered to have lasted from Turki ibn Abdallah's capture of Riyadh (which he designated as the new capital) in 1824 until the Battle of Mulayda in 1891. The Second Saudi period was marked by instability, which the Al Rashid clan of Jebel Shammar were able to exploit. The Saudi leader, Abdul Rahman ibn Faisal, sought refuge in Ottoman Iraq in 1893.

History

Saudi take over of Riyadh

In 1901, Abdul Rahman's son, Abdulaziz bin Abdul Rahman Al Saud–later to be known as Ibn Saud– asked the Emir of Kuwait for men and supplies for an attack on Riyadh. Already involved in several wars with the Rashidis, the Emir agreed to the request, giving Ibn Saud horses and arms. Although the exact number of men waxed and waned during the subsequent journey, he is believed to have left with around 40 men.

In January 1902, Ibn Saud and his men reached Riyadh. With only a small force, he felt that the only way to take the city was to capture Masmak fort and kill Ibn Ajlan, Chief of Riyadh, and having achieved these goals they successfully took the city within the night. With the capture of his family's ancestral home, Ibn Saud proved he possessed the qualities necessary to be a sheikh or emir: leadership, courage, and luck. This marked the beginning of the third Saudi state. Ibn Saud's dominions became known as the Emirate of Riyadh which lasted until 1921.

Saudi–Rashidi War

The Saudi–Rashidi War, also referred as the "First Saudi–Rashidi War" or the "Battles for Qasim", was engaged between the Saudi loyal forces of the newborn Sultanate of Nejd versus the Emirate of Ha'il (Jabal Shammar), under the Rashidis. The warfare period of sporadic battles ended with Saudi takeover of the Al-Qassim Region, after decisive victory in Qasim on 13 April 1906, though other engagements followed into 1907.

Al-Hasa and Qatif

In 1913, Ibn Saud, with support from the Ikhwan, conquered al-Hasa from an Ottoman garrison which had controlled the area from 1871. He then integrated al-Hasa and Qatif into the Emirate. The people in these areas were Shia, whereas the Saudis were Sunni Wahhabi puritans, resulting in harsh treatment for Shi'a Muslims in Saudi Arabia, as opposed to the relatively tolerant treatment by Sunni Ottomans.

Kuwait–Najd War

The Kuwait-Najd War occurred because Ibn Saud wanted to annex Kuwait. Ibn Saud insisted that Kuwait's territory belonged to him. The sharpened conflict between Kuwait and Najd led to the death of hundreds of Kuwaitis. The war resulted in sporadic border clashes throughout 1919–1920.

Following Kuwait–Najd War, Ibn Saud imposed a tight trade blockade against Kuwait for 14 years from 1923 until 1937. The goal of the Saudi economic and military attacks on Kuwait was to annex as much of Kuwait's territory as possible. At the Uqair conference in 1922, the boundaries of Kuwait and Najd were set. Kuwait had no representative at the Uqair conference. Ibn Saud persuaded Sir Percy Cox to give him two-thirds of Kuwait's territory due to his de facto control of it. More than half of Kuwait was lost due to Uqair. After the Uqair conference, Kuwait was still subjected to a Saudi economic blockade and intermittent Saudi raiding.

During World War I

In December, the British government (started early 1915) attempted to cultivate favor with Ibn Saud via its secret agent, Captain William Shakespear, and this resulted in the Treaty of Darin. After Shakespear's death at the Battle of Jarrab, the British began supporting Ibn Saud's rival Sharif Hussein bin Ali, leader of the Hejaz. Lord Kitchener also appealed to Hussein bin Ali, Sharif of Mecca for assistance in the conflict and Hussein wanted political recognition in return. An exchange of letters with Henry McMahon assured him that his assistance would be rewarded between Egypt and Persia, with the exception of imperial possessions and interests in Kuwait, Aden, and the Syrian coast.  Contrary to its negotiations with Ali, the British entered into the Treaty of Darin, which made the lands of the House of Saud a British protectorate. Ibn Saud pledged to again make war against Ibn Rashid, who was an ally of the Ottomans. Ibn Saud was also given a sum of £20,000 upon signing the treaty as well as a monthly stipend of £5000 in exchange for waging war against Ibn Rashid.

First Nejd–Hejaz War

The First Saudi-Hashemite War or the Al-Khurma dispute took place in 1918–1919 between Abdulaziz Al Saud of the Emirate of Nejd and the Hashemites of the Kingdom of Hejaz. The war came within the scope of the historic conflict between the Hashemites of Hejaz and the Saudis of Riyadh (Nejd) over supremacy in Arabia. It resulted in the defeat of the Hashemite forces and capture of al-Khurma by the Saudis and his allied Ikhwan, but British intervention prevented the immediate collapse of the Hashemite kingdom, establishing a sensitive cease-fire, which would last until 1924.

Conquest of Ha'il

Conquest of Ha'il, also referred as the Second Saudi–Rashidi War, was engaged by the Saudi forces with its ally Ikhwan tribesmen upon the Emirate of Ha'il (Jabal Shammar), under the last Rashidi rulers. On 2 November 1921, Jebel Shammar was completely conquered by Saudi forces and subsequently incorporated into the Sultanate of Nejd.

Ikhwan raids

Raids on Transjordan

Ikhwan raids on Transjordan were a series of plunders by the Ikhwan, irregular Arab tribesmen of Najd, on Transjordan between 1922 and 1924. Though the raids were not orchestrated by Ibn Saud, the ruler of Nejd, nothing was done by him to stop the raiding parties of his ally Ikhwanis. This however changed after the conquest of Hejaz, when the increasingly critical and negative stance of Ibn Saud on Ikhwan raids developed into an open feud and essentially a bloody conflict since 1927.

In the early 1920s, the repeated Wahhabi incursions of Ikhwan from Najd into southern parts of his territory were the most serious threat to emir Abdullah's position in Transjordan. The emir was powerless to repel those raids by himself, thus the British maintained a military base, with a small air force, at Marka, close to Amman.

1921 raid on Mandatory Iraq
In 1921, an Ikhwan party raided southern Iraq which was under the British mandate, pillaging Shia villages, resulting in the massacre of 700 Shias.

Second Nejd–Hejaz War

The Saudi conquest of Hejaz was a campaign, engaged by Saudi Sultan Abdulaziz Al Saud to take over the Hashemite Kingdom of Hejaz in 1924–1925. The campaign successfully ended in December 1925, with the fall of Jeddah. Subsequently, in 1926, Abdulaziz was proclaimed king of Hejaz, and raised Nejd to a kingdom as well in 1927. For the next five-plus years, the Saudi domains were referred to as the Kingdom of Nejd and Hejaz, though they were administered as separate units.

Ikhwan rebellion

As Saudi expansion slowed in the 1920s, some among the Ikhwan pushed for continued expansion, particularly to the British-controlled territories such as Transjordan to the north - where the Ikhwan raided in 1922 and 1924. By this time, the few parts of central Arabia that hadn't been overrun by the Saudi-Ikhwan forces had treaties with Britain, and Abdulaziz was sober enough to realize the folly of a potential conflict with the British.  However, the Ikhwan had been taught that all non-Wahhabis were infidels. Faisal al-Dawish of the Mutair tribe and Sultan bin Bajad of the Otaiba tribe, the leaders of the Ikhwan, were among those who accused Abdulaziz of going "soft", with the former reportedly telling the latter that the Saudis were "as much use as camel bags without handles".

A rebellion erupted, climaxing in a battle at Sabillah, which some have labeled a massacre but pro-Saudi sources consider to have been a fair fight. Additional battles erupted through 1929 in Jabal Shammar and in the vicinity of the Awazim tribe. The rebellion was put down in 1930, with the surrender of last opposition elements. Though the survivors were jailed, their descendants remained opposed to Saudi rule, and one such descendant, Juhayman al-Otaibi, would gain infamy in 1979 when he led the Grand Mosque Seizure.

Proclamation of the Kingdom of Saudi Arabia

From 1927 to 1932, Ibn Saud administered the two main portions of his realm, Nejd and the Hejaz, as separate units. On 23 September 1932, Ibn Saud proclaimed the union of his dominions into the Kingdom of Saudi Arabia. Ibn Saud's eldest son Saud became crown prince in 1933.

Aftermath

Annexation of Asir

The region of Asir, in what is today southern Saudi Arabia, had been under Turkish rule from 1871 until the outbreak of the First World War, at which point its emir, Hasan ibn Ali Al Aid, "became virtually independent" and attempted to rule from Abha. However, a struggle ensued between his forces and those of Muhammad ibn Ali al-Idrisi, who eventually set up the short-lived Idrisid Emirate under Saudi tutelage. The emirate was subsumed by the Saudi state following a 1930 treaty which provided for the territory to come under Ibn Saud's direct control upon its emir's death. The Emirate was eventually incorporated into the Kingdom of Saudi Arabia in 1934.

Saudi–Yemeni War

With the disintegration of the Ottoman Empire, a Zaidi state was forged in Yemen under Imam Muhammad bin Yahya Hamid ad-Din and his descendants. The Yemenis claimed parts of Asir and came to blows with the Saudis in 1933. Writing in the American journal Foreign Affairs in 1934, historian Hans Kohn noted, "Some European observers have wished to explain the armed conflict as a conflict between British and Italian policy in Arabia." Despite British ties to Saudi Arabia and Italian ties to Yemen, he concluded that "the rivalry between the two rulers is in no way caused or fostered by the rivalry of the two European states." However, in 1998, Alexei Vassiliev wrote, "The imam was instigated both by the Italians, who promoted assistance in order to increase their influence in Yemen, and by the British, who wished to detract Imam Yahya's attention from their protectorates in Aden." The Saudis struck back, reaching the Yemeni port of Al Hudaydah before signing a "treaty of Muslim friendship and Arab brotherhood" in Ta'if, which was published simultaneously in Mecca, Sanaa, Damascus, and Cairo to highlight its pan-Arabism.

Remarking on the implications of the treaty, which stated "that [the two parties'] nations are one and agree to consider each other's interests their own", Kohn wrote, "The foreign policy of both kingdoms will be brought into line and harmonized so that both countries will act as one country in foreign affairs. Practically, it will mean a protectorate over the Yemen by Ibn Saud, the stronger and much more progressive partner." Relations indeed remained close until civil war erupted in Yemen in the 1960s, at which time the country became a staging ground for battle between conservative values and those of the Egyptian revolutionary Gamal Abdel Nasser.

Ikhwan movement

The exact circumstances under which the Ikhwan (brothers, brethren) arose remain unclear. However, it is known that they consisted of Bedouin who were imbued with Wahhabi zeal at settlements known as hijras. They played an important role in the Saudi rise to power, though the extent of that role is sometimes disputed.

See also

 Geography of Saudi Arabia
 Saudi Arabia – United Arab Emirates border dispute
 Saudi–Kuwaiti neutral zone
 Saudi–Iraqi neutral zone
 Sykes–Picot Agreement

Footnotes
[A]. Unification of Saudi Arabia (combined casualties figure estimation 7,989–8,989+) of:
Battle of Riyadh (1902) – 37 killed.
Battle of Dilam (1903) – 410 killed.
Saudi–Rashidi War (1903–1907) – 2,300+ killed.
Annexation of Al-Hasa and Qatif (1913) - unknown.
Battle of Jarrab (1915)
Battle of Kanzan (1915)
First Nejd-Hijaz War (1918-1919) – 1,392 killed.
1921 Ikhwan raid on Mandatory Iraq - 700 killed
Kuwait–Nejd Border War (1921) – 200+ killed.
Conquest of Ha'il (1921) - unknown
Ikhwan raids on Transjordan (1922–1924) – 500–1,500 killed.
Saudi conquest of Hejaz (1924–1925) – 450+ killed.
Ikhwan Revolt (1927–1930) – 2,000 killed.

Notes

References

Sources

External links

Hous of Saud, a 2005 documentary by PBS' Frontline. Website includes interviews and an excerpt containing the chapter on the Ikhwan.

20th-century conflicts
20th century in Saudi Arabia
History of Saudi Arabia
Ibn Saud
Saudi Arabia
Pan-Arabism
Wars involving Saudi Arabia
Wars involving the Ottoman Empire